Miroslava Pribylova  (born ) is a Canadian retired volleyball player, who played as a setter.

She was part of the Canada women's national volleyball team at the 2002 FIVB Volleyball Women's World Championship in Germany. On club level she played with SSV Ulm Aliud Pharma.

Clubs
 SSV Ulm Aliud Pharma (2002)

References

External links

Edmonton Journal
www.ualberta.ca 

1970 births
Living people
Canadian women's volleyball players
Place of birth missing (living people)
Setters (volleyball)
Expatriate volleyball players in Germany
Canadian expatriate sportspeople in Germany